Cloudy with a Chance of Meatballs is a 2009 American computer-animated science fiction comedy film produced by Sony Pictures Animation. Loosely based on the 1978 children's book of the same name by Judi and Ron Barrett, the film was written and directed by Phil Lord and Christopher Miller (in their feature directorial debuts), and stars the voices of Bill Hader, Anna Faris, James Caan, Andy Samberg, Bruce Campbell, Mr. T, Benjamin Bratt, and Neil Patrick Harris. The film centers around an aspiring inventor named Flint Lockwood who develops, following a series of failed experiments, a machine that can convert water into food. After the machine gains sentience and begins to develop food storms, Flint must stop it in order to save the world.

Cloudy with a Chance of Meatballs premiered at the Mann Village Theater in Los Angeles, California on September 12, 2009, and was released in the United States six days later on September 18, by Sony Pictures Releasing under its Columbia Pictures label. It earned over $243 million worldwide on a budget of $100 million at the box office. The film received generally positive reviews from critics, who praised its colorful visuals, humor, characters, voice acting, and the score, while the simple character designs were said to be unfitting. The film has since been expanded into a franchise, with a sequel, Cloudy with a Chance of Meatballs 2, released on September 27, 2013, as well as an animated television series based on the film that premiered on Cartoon Network on February 20, 2017, with none of the original cast returning.

Plot 

Aspiring scientist Flint Lockwood lives with his widowed father, Tim, and his monkey assistant, Steve, in Swallow Falls, an island in the Atlantic Ocean with an economy based on sardines. As sardines are considered unsavory by the rest of the world, the island's economy declines, forcing its citizens to subsist on a mainly sardine-based diet. One day, Flint develops the Flint Lockwood Diatonic Super Mutating Dynamic Food Replicator, a device that converts water into food, in an effort to expand the town's diet, much to the chagrin of Tim, who, annoyed by Flint's many failed contraptions, wants him to run the family business instead. Flint's first attempt to plug in the device knocks out his house's power, so he connects the FLDSMDFR to a local substation, overloading it and sending it rocketing across town, demolishing Sardine Land, a sardine-themed amusement park meant to revitalize the town, and disappearing into the sky. The chaos earns Flint the fury of the town, of amateur field reporter Sam Sparks, and the disappointment of Tim.

Soon after, cheeseburgers start falling from the sky and Flint realizes the FLDSMDFR is functioning successfully in the stratosphere, using the condensation from clouds to create food-based weather systems while keeping itself afloat. The citizens of Swallow Falls rejoice in their new food choices, renaming it Chewandswallow, and it becomes a "food tourism" destination, making Flint an international celebrity. Flint and Sam grow closer after she reveals that she was teased as a child for her glasses and her fascination with meteorology. However, Flint notices the FLDSMDFR's food has begun to gradually become bigger in size, due to the FLDSMDFR's creations mutating in the atmosphere, having been overloaded by the massive amounts of water vapor. He attempts to warn the town's mayor about the FLDSMDFR's malfunction, though the mayor is too concerned about profit and ignores him.

After a tornado made of spaghetti threatens the town, Flint attempts to shut the FLDSMDFR down, only for the mayor to inadvertently destroy the console while trying to stop him, causing the machine to go rogue and generate a massive storm. Flint creates a USB flash drive designed to shut down the FLDSMDFR and uses his repurposed flying car to reach it, accompanied by Steve, Sam, her cameraman Manny, and the town's former mascot Brent. Upon reaching the FLDSMDFR, they discover it has surrounded itself in a giant meatball-like object made of food for protection. As the group bores inside, the flash drive is lost, prompting Flint to call Tim and instruct him to email the drive's code to his cell phone via his laboratory's computer. On reaching the FLDSMDFR, Flint connects his phone with the flash drive's code sent to it by Tim, only to discover that the wrong file was sent. All appears lost until Flint uses his Spray-On Shoes formula on the machine, causing it to explode and destroy the meatball, ending the storm. After surviving the destruction, Flint reunites with Tim, who finally shows appreciation for his son's inventions, and Sam, with whom he shares a kiss.

Voice cast
 Bill Hader as Flint Lockwood, an unsuccessful and timid but determined young inventor, and Sam's love interest. Hader also voices the FLDSMDFR
 Max Neuwirth as young Flint
 Anna Faris as Samantha "Sam" Sparks, a weather intern from New York City and later Flint's love interest
 Neil Patrick Harris as Steve, Flint's pet vervet monkey and best friend, who communicates through a thought translator Flint invented
 James Caan as Timothy "Tim" Lockwood, Flint's technophobic fisherman father
 Bruce Campbell as Mayor Shelbourne, the town's corrupt Mayor
 Andy Samberg as "Baby" Brent McHale, arrogant and dim-witted mascot of the sardine cannery
 Mr. T as Officer Earl Devereaux, athletic police officer and Cal's father
 Bobb'e J. Thompson as Calvin "Cal" Devereaux, Earl's young son
 Benjamin Bratt as Manny, Sam's Guatemalan cameraman and former doctor, pilot, and comedian
 Al Roker as Patrick Patrickson, weather station anchorman
 Lauren Graham as Fran Lockwood, Flint's late mother who always expressed her belief in her son
 Will Forte as Joe Towne, a redneck
 Angela V. Shelton as Regina Devereaux, Earl's wife and Cal's mother

Production

Development 
On May 9, 2003, a year after establishment, Sony Pictures Animation announced its first animated slate, including Cloudy with a Chance of Meatballs, a film adaptation of the book of the same name. The Brizzi brothers were brought to direct the film, with Wayne Rice adapting the screenplay. In 2006, it was reported that the film had been helmed by new directors and writers, Phil Lord and Christopher Miller. Lord and Miller said later that year that it would be a homage to, and a parody of, disaster films such as Twister, Armageddon, The Core, and The Day After Tomorrow.

Story and script 
After a year working on the script, Lord and Christopher Miller were fired for story issues and replaced with new writers, who after a year were also fired. Lord and Miller were then re-hired in 2006. The two completely redid the script, this time with the creative input of their crew. The new draft had the protagonist as a failed inventor who wanted to prove himself to his town. The two were almost fired again after Amy Pascal, then-head of Sony Pictures, criticized the film for lack of story. Although the film succeeded on the comedic front in the animatic stage, Pascal cited the lack of an anchoring relationship in the film as a failure in the story telling. Unable to create new characters and environments to suit the new story demands, the two elevated the character of the tackle shop extra to be the protagonist's father, thereby creating the relationship Pascal had requested. The pair's experience on Cloudy taught them two valuable lessons: the power of creative collaboration and the importance of emotion in a story.

Casting 
On September 18, 2008, Variety announced that Bill Hader and Anna Faris had signed on to voice the two lead characters, with James Caan, Bruce Campbell, Mr. T, Andy Samberg, Neil Patrick Harris, Bobb'e J. Thompson, Benjamin Bratt, Al Roker, Lauren Graham, and Will Forte also in the voice cast.

Animation 
Cloudy with a Chance of Meatballs is the second film after Monster House that was made using the animation rendering software Arnold. Justin K. Thompson served as production designer.

Music

Cloudy with a Chance of Meatballs is the soundtrack to the film of the same name, released under Sony Pictures Entertainment on September 15, 2009. The music of the film and this album are both credited to be composed and produced by American composer Mark Mothersbaugh of Devo. "Raining Sunshine", performed by Miranda Cosgrove, was released as a promotional single on August 24, 2009.

Release 
Cloudy with a Chance of Meatballs premiered on September 12, 2009, at the Mann Village Theatre in Los Angeles, California. The film had its wide release on September 18, 2009, along with a digitally re-mastered release to IMAX 3D theatres.

Home media 
The film was released on DVD, Blu-ray Disc, and PSP UMD on January 5, 2010 in the United States and Canada. A 3D Blu-ray was released on June 22, 2010. It was the first 3D Blu-ray sold individually in the United States.

In April 2021, Sony signed a deal with Disney giving them access to their legacy content, including Cloudy with a Chance of Meatballs and its sequel to stream on Disney+ and Hulu and appear on Disney's linear television networks. Disney's access to Sony's titles would come following their availability on Netflix.

Art book 
In August 2009, Insight Editions published a companion book to the film called The Art and Making of Cloudy with a Chance of Meatballs.

Reception

Critical response 
On Rotten Tomatoes the film has a "Certified Fresh" rating of 86% based on 142 reviews with an average rating of 7.3/10. The consensus statement reads, "Quirky humor, plucky characters and solid slapstick make this family comedy a frenetically tasty time at the movies." On Metacritic it has a weighted average score of 66 out of 100, based on 24 reviews, indicating "generally favorable reviews". Audiences polled by CinemaScore gave the film an average grade of "A−" on an A+ to F scale.

Ernest Hardy of LA Weekly stated the film "is smart, insightful on a host of relationship dynamics, and filled with fast-paced action". Hardy also applauded the 3-D effects which "are wonderful, full of witty sight gags that play out both center-screen and on the periphery". Michael Phillips of the Chicago Tribune gave the film a mixed review stating that "Crazy doesn't always equal funny, and the gigantism of this 3-D offering's second half puts a damper on your enjoyment. But look: This film wasn't made for you, or me. It was made for dangerously, easily distracted 9-year-olds." Kyle Smith of the New York Post gave the film two stars stating that the animated film "greatly expands on the kids' book on which it's based in a clever and engaging first half. But the second half leaves a foul aftertaste."

Box office 
Cloudy with a Chance of Meatballs earned a total of $243 million on a reported budget of $100 million. Of the gross, 51%, or $124,870,275, came from the domestic market, while the rest, $118,135,851, from other territories. For the film's marketing, Sony spent $43.3 million in the United States, and $26 million in other countries. The film earned $8,137,358 on its opening Friday, and ranked #1 at the box office with a total of $30.3 million for the first weekend. On its second weekend, it remained at #1 with a decrease of only 17%. 
Documents from the Sony Pictures hack revealed the film turned a profit of $6 million.

Accolades

Expanded franchise

Sequel

A sequel, titled Cloudy with a Chance of Meatballs 2, was released on September 27, 2013. Directed by Cody Cameron and Kris Pearn, and it is based on an original idea, where Flint and his friends must again save the world from his food machine, which survived the explosion in the prequel. This time, the machine gains the ability to produce living food beasts. Most of the main cast reprised their roles, but Earl, the town cop, is now voiced by Terry Crews since Mr. T declined to return. New cast also includes Kristen Schaal as orangutan Barb, and Will Forte in his new role of Chester V.

Television series

On October 9, 2014, DHX Media announced that it will develop and produce a television series based on the film franchise, titled Cloudy with a Chance of Meatballs: The Series. The series will be traditionally animated and will consist of twenty-six 22-minute episodes. It will take place before the first film, showing Flint Lockwood as a high school student who dreams of becoming a serious scientist. In his adventures, he will be joined by Sam Sparks, a new girl in town and the school's "wannabe" reporter, along with Flint's dad Tim, Steve the Monkey, Manny as the head of the school's audiovisual club, Earl as a school gym teacher, Brent as a baby wear model, and mayor Shelbourne. DHX Media will handle the global television and non-US home entertainment distribution, along with worldwide merchandising rights, while Sony will distribute home entertainment in the US. Commissioned by Teletoon in Canada, the series will air on Cartoon Network in the United States, and on the Boomerang channel in other territories. None of the original cast returned for the show and are replaced by Canadian voice actors.

See also 
 Cloudy with a Chance of Meatballs (video game), based on the film.
 2012, a Sony disaster film released nearly two months after Meatballs

 Real life food spill disasters and weather phenomena
 Boston Molasses Disaster
 Honolulu molasses spill
 London Beer Flood
 Kentucky meat shower

References

External links 

 
 
 
 
 
 

2009 3D films
2009 comedy films
2009 computer-animated films
2009 directorial debut films
2009 fantasy films
2009 films
2009 science fiction films
2000s American animated films
2000s children's fantasy films
2000s English-language films
3D animated films
American 3D films
American animated feature films
American children's animated comic science fiction films
American children's animated science fantasy films
American computer-animated films
American disaster films
American fantasy comedy films
Animated films based on children's books
Animated films set in London
Animated films set in New York City
Animated films set in Paris
Cloudy with a Chance of Meatballs (franchise)
Columbia Pictures animated films
Columbia Pictures films
Films about father–son relationships
Films about food and drink
Films adapted into television shows
Films directed by Phil Lord and Christopher Miller
Films scored by Mark Mothersbaugh
Films set in China
Films set in Egypt
Films set on fictional islands
Films with screenplays by Christopher Miller (filmmaker)
Films with screenplays by Phil Lord
IMAX films
Sony Pictures Animation films